is a former Japanese football player.

Playing career
Nagata was born in Nagasaki Prefecture on 28 March 1972. After graduating from high school, he joined Mazda (later Sanfrecce Hiroshima) in 1990. On 8 August 1993, he debuted as forward against Gamba Osaka. However he could only play that match at the club. In 1994, he moved to Prefectural Leagues club Oita Trinity. The club was promoted to Regional Leagues in 1995 and Japan Football League in 1996. He played many matches as defender at the club. He retired end of 1997 season.

Club statistics

References

External links

1972 births
Living people
Association football people from Nagasaki Prefecture
Japanese footballers
Japan Soccer League players
J1 League players
Japan Football League (1992–1998) players
Sanfrecce Hiroshima players
Oita Trinita players
Association football forwards